Bisamberg is a municipality in the district of Korneuburg in Austria.

Geography
It lies about 5 km northeast of Vienna in the Weinviertel in Lower Austria. About 24.43 percent of the municipality is forested.

The municipality includes the villages of Bisamberg and Klein-Engersdorf.

References

External links

 Bisamberg Homepage

Cities and towns in Korneuburg District